Robert "Bob" Kerr Goodwin is an American non-profit executive, political appointee, and publisher known for serving as CEO of Points of Light.

Early life and education
Goodwin was born in Tulsa, Oklahoma in 1948 to E.L. Goodwin, an attorney and a newspaper publisher, and Jeanne Osby Goodwin, a social worker and teacher. After graduating from Bishop Kelley High School, earned his undergraduate degree from Oral Roberts University and his masters in philosophy from San Francisco Theological Seminary.

Career
After earning his graduate degree, Goodwin returned to Tulsa to join the family newspaper, The Oklahoma Eagle, one of the most influential black-owned newspapers in the United States.

Government and Nonprofit Work
After years working in media, Goodwin transitioned to working for colleges and universities, taking public affairs and advocacy positions at Prairie View A&M University and Texas A&M University.  During the 1988 election, Goodwin led the Democrats for Bush movement. After George H. W. Bush was elected, Goodwin accepted a political appointment to serve in the United States Department of Education, where he led the White House Initiative for Historically Black Colleges. In 1992, he joined the Bush-founded Points of Light Foundation and, in 1995 became its President and CEO.

References

Living people
1948 births
African-American businesspeople
Prairie View A&M University people
21st-century African-American people
20th-century African-American people